Wärtsilä is the second largest diesel engine company in the world. Wärtsilä released the Vasa engine series in 1977 and remained in production until 2010. These popular medium speed diesels were produced in Vasa, Finland; hence their name, Vasa. The lead designer of the first engine was Wilmer Wahlstedt. The series comprises three models, the Vasa 22, 32, and 46, with the number denoting the bore size of the engine. Vasa 32 engines are the most popular of the series and can still be found throughout the marine and power generation industries. '''

Wärtsilä discontinued production of the series in 2010 to make way for new technology. The Vasa series acted as a precursor to the newer 32 D & E series and RTFLEX engines, which are more efficient and have a higher power output.

Models 
 Wärtsilä Vasa 22
 Wärtsilä Vasa 32
 Wärtsilä Vasa 46

Technical data

Wärtsilä produced the engine with versatility in mind. They were designed for both shipboard and power plant applications. The engine could be ordered with a 220, 320, and 460 mm bore in both V and inline configurations. The inline style was available with up to 9 cylinders and V could support up to 18. The most popular was the inline 320 mm bore. Due to the popularity of the VASA32LN engine it was redesigned with a longer stroke to increase horsepower and now for sale as the 32 D and E series.

Vasa engines are turbocharged, non-reversible, and utilize a direct fuel injection system. They were designed to continuously run on HFO (heavy fuel oil), provided that the fuel is pre-heated and at the correct viscosity at the time of injection.

This is the power rating table generated for the Vasa 32LN engine. Engine power ratings are determined by how the engine is being used. The Vasa engines offer 375 kW/cyl and 410 kW/cyl. As the number of cylinders are increased the power is increased. This also applies with the size of the bore, the 220 mm bore engine will provide less hp and kW than that of the 320 mm bore. In short, the size of the engine needed depends on the application it is being used for.

Lubrication

Vasa engines utilize a circulating oil system for lubrication, complete with a main, pre-lubricating pump, and an oil cooler. Smaller Vasa engines use gear type pumps for lubrication where the larger engines use wheel type pumps.

Starting Mechanism

Air is utilized to start the engines. Each cylinder head is equipped with a start air valve that delivers high-pressure air to the cylinder upon startup. This provides the engine the initial rotation force needed to achieve combustion.

Fresh Water Cooling

Treated fresh water is used for cooling of the cylinder, charge air, turbocharger, and oil. Freshwater cooling is divided into two systems the HT (High Temperature) cooling the cylinders and turbocharger and the LT (Low Temperature) cooling the oil and charge air. The freshwater temperature is closely regulated with a thermostatic valve to achieve optimum efficiency. At low engine loads the charge can be too cool, which can cause incomplete combustion. To counteract this heat rejected to the lubrication oil can be used to heat the freshwater, which in turn heats the charge air enough to ensure complete combustion.

Control Systems

Vasa engines have the capability of being started remotely away from the engine or manually by manipulation of valves on start air system. Safeguards are in place to assure that accidental startup does not occur. Upon startup engine speed is controlled by a governor, which mechanically adjusts fuel delivery to match the load demanded of the engine.

Conditions are also in place to protect the engine. During operation an engine will automatically cease injection if all preset conditions are not met. In addition, emergency situations may also trip the engine to prevent catastrophic failure and crew casualties.

Applications

Primarily used for power generation and diesel-electric propulsion plants. The engines run well at a constant speed making them great generator prime movers. Because they are non-reversible they are not widely used as propulsion engines. The engines were utilized to provide electrical power for both propulsion and auxiliary services. Due to their ability to run on HFO (heavy fuel oil) or MDO (Marine Diesel Oil) many ships were outfitted with the Vasa series engines.

In the power generation industry these engines are used as auxiliary generators or a means of backup power generation.

See also 
 Wickström

References

Vasa
Science and technology in Finland

fi:Wärtsilä#Dieselmoottorit